Experiments directed toward developing fusion power are invariably done with dedicated machines which can be classified according to the principles they use to confine the plasma fuel and keep it hot.

The major division is between magnetic confinement and inertial confinement. In magnetic confinement, the tendency of the hot plasma to expand is counteracted by the Lorentz force between currents in the plasma and magnetic fields produced by external coils. The particle and energy confinement times may range from under a millisecond to over a second, but the configuration itself is often maintained through input of particles, energy, and current for times that are hundreds or thousands of times longer. Some concepts are capable of maintaining a plasma indefinitely.

In contrast, with inertial confinement, there is nothing to counteract the expansion of the plasma. The confinement time is simply the time it takes the plasma pressure to overcome the inertia of the particles, hence the name. These conditions are obtained by irradiating a millimeter-sized solid pellet with a nanosecond laser or ion pulse. The outer layer of the pellet is ablated, providing a reaction force that compresses the central 10% of the fuel by a factor of 10 or 20 to 103 or  times solid density. These microplasmas disperse in a time measured in nanoseconds. For a fusion power reactor, a repetition rate of several per second will be needed.

Magnetic confinement 
Within the field of magnetic confinement experiments, there is a basic division between toroidal and open magnetic field topologies. Generally speaking, it is easier to contain a plasma in the direction perpendicular to the field than parallel to it. Parallel confinement can be solved either by bending the field lines back on themselves into circles or, more commonly, toroidal surfaces, or by constricting the bundle of field lines at both ends, which causes some of the particles to be reflected by the mirror effect. The toroidal geometries can be further subdivided according to whether the machine itself has a toroidal geometry, i.e., a solid core through the center of the plasma. The alternative is to dispense with a solid core and rely on currents in the plasma to produce the toroidal field.

Mirror machines have advantages in a simpler geometry and a better potential for direct conversion of particle energy to electricity. They generally require higher magnetic fields than toroidal machines, but the biggest problem has turned out to be confinement. For good confinement there must be more particles moving perpendicular to the field than there are moving parallel to the field. Such a non-Maxwellian velocity distribution is, however, very difficult to maintain and energetically costly.

The mirrors' advantage of simple machine geometry is maintained in machines which produce compact toroids, but there are potential disadvantages for stability in not having a central conductor and there is generally less possibility to control (and thereby optimize) the magnetic geometry. Compact toroid concepts are generally less well developed than those of toroidal machines.  While this does not necessarily mean that they cannot work better than mainstream concepts, the uncertainty involved is much greater.

Somewhat in a class by itself is the Z-pinch, which has circular field lines. This was one of the first concepts tried, but it did not prove very successful. Furthermore, there was never a convincing concept for turning the pulsed machine requiring electrodes into a practical reactor.

The dense plasma focus is a controversial and "non-mainstream" device that relies on currents in the plasma to produce a toroid. It is a pulsed device that depends on a plasma that is not in equilibrium and has the potential for direct conversion of particle energy to electricity. Experiments are ongoing to test relatively new theories to determine if the device has a future.

Toroidal machine 
Toroidal machines can be axially symmetric, like the tokamak and the reversed field pinch (RFP), or asymmetric, like the stellarator. The additional degree of freedom gained by giving up toroidal symmetry might ultimately be usable to produce better confinement, but the cost is complexity in the engineering, the theory, and the experimental diagnostics. Stellarators typically have a periodicity, e.g. a fivefold rotational symmetry. The RFP, despite some theoretical advantages such as a low magnetic field at the coils, has not proven very successful.

Tokamak

Stellarator

Magnetic mirror 
 Tabletop/Toytop, Lawrence Livermore National Laboratory, Livermore CA.
 DCX/DCX-2, Oak Ridge National Laboratory
 ORGA, Akademgorodok, Russia.
 Baseball I/Baseball II Lawrence Livermore National Laboratory, Livermore CA.
 2X/2XIII/2XIII-B, Lawrence Livermore National Laboratory, Livermore CA.
 TMX, TMX-U Lawrence Livermore National Laboratory, Livermore CA.
 MFTF Lawrence Livermore National Laboratory, Livermore CA.
 Gas Dynamic Trap at Budker Institute of Nuclear Physics, Akademgorodok, Russia.

Toroidal Z-pinch 
 Perhapsatron (1953, USA)
 ZETA (Zero Energy Thermonuclear Assembly) (1957, United Kingdom)

Reversed field pinch (RFP) 
 ETA-BETA II in Padua, Italy (1979–1989)
 RFX (Reversed-Field eXperiment), Consorzio RFX, Padova, Italy
 MST (Madison Symmetric Torus), University of Wisconsin–Madison, United States
 T2R, Royal Institute of Technology, Stockholm, Sweden
 TPE-RX, AIST, Tsukuba, Japan
 KTX (Keda Torus eXperiment) in China (since 2015)

Spheromak 
 Sustained Spheromak Physics Experiment

Field-reversed configuration (FRC) 
 C-2 Tri Alpha Energy
 C-2U Tri Alpha Energy
 C-2W TAE Technologies
 LSX University of Washington
 IPA University of Washington
 HF University of Washington
 IPA- HF University of Washington

Open field lines

Plasma pinch 
 Trisops – 2 facing theta-pinch guns
 FF-2B, Lawrenceville Plasma Physics, United States

Levitated dipole 
 Levitated Dipole Experiment (LDX), MIT/Columbia University, United States

Inertial confinement

Laser-driven

Z-pinch 

Z Pulsed Power Facility
ZEBRA device at the University of Nevada's Nevada Terawatt Facility
Saturn accelerator at Sandia National Laboratory
 MAGPIE at Imperial College London
COBRA at Cornell University
PULSOTRON

Inertial electrostatic confinement 

Fusor
 List of fusor examples
Polywell

Magnetized target fusion 

FRX-L
FRCHX
General Fusion – under development
LINUS project

References

See also
 List of nuclear reactors

Fusion power
Magnetic confinement fusion devices